Xuyi is a county under the administration of Huai'an Prefecture in central Jiangsu Province in eastern China. The southernmost of Huai'an's county-level divisions, it borders the prefecture-level cities of Suqian, Jiangsu, to the north and Chuzhou, Anhui, to the south and west. Xuyi is the site of the Ming Zuling tombs and also noted for production of crayfish.

Name
Xuyi is the atonal pinyin romanization of the Standard Mandarin pronunciation of the Chinese name . The same name was previously romanized as Hsü-i in Wade-Giles and Chuyi in Postal Map romanization. The meaning of the name is unclear, but probably derives from phonetic transcription of an earlier name from the Dongyi or Wu who once held the area. It has also been variously derived from the idea of looking ahead with one's eyes opened widein reference to its position on a hill in wide plainor to another nearby hill named Xuyi.

History 

In medieval China, the area around Xuyi was administered as part of the prefecture or subprefecture of Sizhou. It was the hometown of Zhu Yuanzhang's family, which fled to Fengyang before his birth and rise to power as the Hongwu Emperor of the Ming. He subsequently erected the expansive Ming Zuling tomb nearby, where veneration could be offered to his grandfather, great-grandfather, and great-great-grandfather, all posthumously elevated to the dignity of honorary emperors. Under the Ming, the area was part of Nanzhili, the special directly-administered district around the southern capital at Nanjing.

Under the Qing, the province was renamed Jiangnan. Sizhou fell under its "Left" Governor and was later made part of Anhui Province. During the reign of the Kangxi Emperor, the Yellow Riverthen still flowing along a course south of Shandongdiverted to join the Huai further upstream. Its silt blocked the previous course of the Huai and caused Hongze Lake to grow enormously, swallowing both Sizhou and Ming Zuling tombs. With the previous county seat submerged, administration was moved first to Xuyi in 1680 and then west to the new Si County in 1777.

After the establishment of the People's Republic of China, Xuyi and Sihong were both moved from Anhui to Jiangsu in 1955 to allow for unified administration for the entire area around Hongze Lake. By the early 1960s, the lake had receded enough that the long-flooded Ming Zuling was rediscovered. After the Cultural Revolution ended, the provincial and national cultural administrations excavated and restored the tombs.

Administrative divisions
In the present, Xuyi County has 14 towns and 5 townships.
14 towns

5 townships

Climate

Sports
The Xuyi Olympic Sports Centre Stadium is located in the city of Xuyi. The football stadium has a capacity of 18,000 and it opened in 2017.
 Luyuan

External links
Xuyi County English guide (Jiangsu.NET)

References

 
County-level divisions of Jiangsu
Huai'an